Rockie Lynne is the self-titled debut studio album by American country music singer Rockie Lynne. The album was released on May 2, 2006 (see 2006 in country music) via Universal South Records. It includes three chart singles in "Lipstick", "Do We Still" and "More", all of which charted on the Billboard country charts. It is his only major-label album.

Content
The album accounted for three singles in all. First was the lead-off track "Lipstick", which Lynne co-wrote with Mark Prentice. This song spent 21 weeks on the Billboard country charts, peaking at #29 on the chart week of March 18, 2006, before falling to #30 a week later. After it came "Do We Still" at #46 and "More" at #48. All twelve songs on the album were co-written by Lynne.

Track listing

Personnel
As listed in liner notes.
Lisa Cochran – background vocals (tracks 1, 3, 4, 7)
Perry Coleman – background vocals (tracks 1-4, 7, 11)
J. T. Corenflos – electric guitar (tracks 1, 3, 4, 7, 9)
Eric Darken – percussion (tracks 2, 11, 12)
Thom Flora – background vocals (tracks 10, 12)
Paul Franklin – lap steel guitar (track 2), pedal steel guitar (tracks 10-12)
Vicki Hampton – background vocals (tracks 5, 6, 8)
Aubrey Haynie – fiddle (tracks 2, 10-12), mandolin (tracks 10, 11)
Wes Hightower – background vocals (tracks 1, 5, 6, 8, 9)
Chris Leuzinger – electric guitar (tracks 2, 10-12)
Rockie Lynne – electric guitar (tracks 1-10)
Kim Parent - background vocals (tracks 4)
George Marinelli – electric guitar (tracks 5, 6, 8)
Terry McMillan – harmonica (track 10)
Greg Morrow – percussion (tracks 1, 3, 4, 6, 7), drums (tracks 2-12)
Steve Nathan – keyboards (tracks 1, 3-9, 12), Hammond B-3 organ (track 2), piano (tracks 10, 11), synthesizer (track 11)
Mark Prentice – bass guitar (tracks 1, 3-9)
Billy Panda – acoustic guitar (tracks 1, 3-9)
Michael Rhodes – bass guitar (tracks 2, 10-12)
Hank Singer – fiddle (track 9)
Jack Solomon – electric guitar (track 9)
Harry Stinson – background vocals (tracks 10, 12)
James Stroud – drums (track 1)
Robby Turner – pedal steel guitar (tracks 5, 6, 8, 9)
Cindy Walker – background vocals (tracks 1, 2, 9, 11)
John Willis – acoustic guitar (tracks 2, 10-12)

Production
Blake Chancey and Tony Brown (tracks 4, 5, 7-9)
Tony Brown (tracks 2, 10-12)
Blake Chancey, Tony Brown, Kevin Law (tracks 1, 3, 6)

Chart performance

Album charts

Singles

References

2006 debut albums
Rockie Lynne albums
Show Dog-Universal Music albums
Albums produced by Tony Brown (record producer)
Albums produced by Blake Chancey